Washuk (Urdu and ) is a rural town and district headquarter of Washuk District, Balochistan, Pakistan. It has a population of 13,372, with 1,948 households.

References

Populated places in Balochistan, Pakistan
Washuk District
Tehsils of Balochistan, Pakistan